James Lacy may refer to:
 James Lacy (actor), British stage actor and theatre manager
 James L. Lacy, American politician from Tennessee
 James T. Lacy, American politician from Virginia
 Jim Lacy, American basketball player